Pocket 808 are a dance music duo from Sydney. Previous named PoxyMusic, the duo is composed of Sameer Sengupta and Ken Cloud. Their music is a mix of dub, rock and hip hop and they feature guest vocalists on their tracks. Singers have included Phil Jamieson and Nathan Hudson.

Their 2003 reworking of "La La Land by Green Velvet", in collaboration with Kid Kenobi, won Best Remix at 2003's Australian Dance Music Awards.

As PoxyMusic they received a nomination for ARIA Award for Best Dance Release at the ARIA Music Awards of 2007 for "She Bites".

Discography

Albums

Singles

Awards and nominations

ARIA Music Awards
The ARIA Music Awards is an annual awards ceremony that recognises excellence, innovation, and achievement across all genres of Australian music.

|-
| 2007 || "She Bites" || ARIA Award for Best Dance Release || 
|-

References

Australian dance music groups